Major Roy de Ruiter,  (born Arnhem, 12 August 1981), is a reservist pilot, active in civil aviation since 2013. De Ruiter is one of the only three living knights 4th class of the Military Order of William, the oldest and highest honour of the Kingdom of the Netherlands.

Biography 
De Ruiter applied to study flight in the Royal Netherlands Air Force at the age of 16 years in 1997. He was accepted to Koninklijke Militaire Academie in Breda in 1999. He completed training in 2001.

Afghanistan 
De Ruiter was deployed in Afghanistan for the first time in 2004. He had several tours to Afghanistan with last deployment in 2009.

Military Order of William 
De Ruiter received the highest military award for his service as an Apache pilot in Afghanistan. The service involved several heroic acts in the period from 2007 to 2009 when the Dutch army was deployed in the province of Uruzgan. Roy de Ruiter is the latest and one of three living recipients of the order.

Civil career 
De Ruiter was honorably discharged from the army in 2013 and started a career in civil aviation. He is currently an instructor pilot for the Royal Oman Police.

Private life 
Roy de Ruiter is married and has two children.

References 

1981 births
Knights Fourth Class of the Military Order of William
Living people
People from Arnhem